Thomas "Tom" Gallagher (born 20 May 1999) is an Australian Paralympic swimmer and surf life saver. He represented Australia at the 2020 Tokyo Paralympics, winning a bronze medal.

Personal
Gallagher was born and grew up in Perth, Western Australia. He has cerebral palsy and suffers from bouts of pancreatitis. In 2019, he moved to the Gold Coast, Queensland, to further his surf life saving career. As of 2021, he is undertaking a Bachelor of Business at Griffith University.

Swimming career
Gallagher is classified as a S10 swimmer. At the 2021 Australian Multi-Class Swimming Championship, he won the gold medal in the Men’s 400m Freestyle Multi-Class in a time of 4:10.17 (997 points), defeating reigning Paralympic champion Brenden Hall.

Surf life saving
Gallagher took up surf life saving in Perth, Western Australia and represented the City of Perth. In 2019, he moved to the Gold Coast, Queensland, to train under surf life saving coach Michael King and represents Currumbin Vikings. His achievements include: 1st Open and U19 ironman WA 2018, 1st U19 board relay Aussies 2018, 3rd U19 ironman Aussies 2018, 1st Open Short Course Coolangatta Gold 2018, Dean Mercery Memorial Trophy Winning 2019 and SOS Surf Race Winner 2020.

At the 2020 Tokyo Paralympics, Gallagher won the bronze medal in the Men's 400 m freestyle S10 and finished fifith in both  Men's 50 m freestyle S10 and Men's 100 m freestyle S10.

References

External links

1999 births
Australian surf lifesavers
Living people
Male Paralympic swimmers of Australia
Medalists at the 2020 Summer Paralympics
Paralympic bronze medalists for Australia
S9-classified Paralympic swimmers
Swimmers at the 2020 Summer Paralympics
Australian male freestyle swimmers
Swimmers from Perth, Western Australia
21st-century Australian people